The Deerfield railway accident occurred on April 7, 1886, outside of Deerfield, Massachusetts. 11 people were killed after a washout caused Passenger Train No. 35 to fall 100 feet down an embankment.

Accident
Around 4:45 pm Passenger Train No. 35, made up of an engine, tender, two baggage cars (one express car and one post office car), a smoking car (belonging to the Fitchburg Railroad), two passenger coaches (one belonging to Fitchburg the other to the Troy and Boston Railroad), and a parlor car, departed North Adams, Massachusetts for Boston with 48 passengers on board. The train was traveling on the Hoosac Tunnel line, which was owned and maintained by the state and operated by the Fitchburg Railroad.

Shortly before 6 pm, the outer rail and a portion of the track between the Bardwell's Ferry and West Deerfield stations gave way due to a washout. The locomotive was wrecked and cars were thrown 100 feet down an embankment. Three of the cars caught fire almost immediately.  All of the cars except for the Troy and Boston coach were destroyed. 47 of the 48 passengers were injured and 11 were killed instantly or died from their injuries.

A special train containing physicians, reporters, and others who could assist was dispatched from Greenfield, Massachusetts. The steepness of the embankment made rendering aid very difficult. The injured were transported to Shelburne Falls, Massachusetts and the deceased to Greenfield.

Investigation
The Massachusetts Railroad Commission found that the slide in the embankment was due to three faults in construction. The first fault was that wooden crib-work had been buried by dirt and rock, which led to the wood rotting away in moist earth. The second fault occurred when plans to build a culvert to drain water from a ditch on the north side of the track to the river were scrapped due to lack of funding. Lastly, the weakened southern slope of the embankment had been weighed down by broken rock that had been dumped there during the addition of a second track.

References

1886 in Massachusetts
Accidents and incidents involving Fitchburg Railroad
April 1886 events
Deerfield, Massachusetts
Railway accidents in 1886
Railway accidents and incidents in Massachusetts